James Kaiwhare Kara-France (born March 26, 1993) is a New Zealand professional mixed martial artist. He currently competes in the Flyweight division in the Ultimate Fighting Championship (UFC). As of August 1, 2022, he is #3 in the UFC flyweight rankings.

Background
Kara-France started practicing Brazilian jiu-jitsu at the age of 10 but stopped after two years. After being bullied for his small stature in high school – Mount Albert Grammar School – he started training mixed martial arts as a whole. Kara-France attended Unitec Institute of Technology for a spell, but dropped out. He is partly of Maori ancestry.

Mixed martial arts career

Early career
In November 2010, Kara-France began his professional MMA career in his home city of Auckland, New Zealand, with a first-round TKO win over Ray Kaitiana.

Kara-France decided to drop out of the university after seeing a Facebook post promoting Tiger Muay Thai gym scholarship. He applied to the gym and was awarded the scholarship after try-outs. He moved to Phuket, Thailand, in 2013 where he trained and built his mixed martial arts record by fighting around Asia and The Pacific.

The Ultimate Fighter
In 2016, Kara-France competed in The Ultimate Fighter: Tournament of Champions - the 24th edition of the UFC-produced reality television series The Ultimate Fighter.  He won his first fight with a 30-second KO win over Terrence Mitchell.  His second and final fight in this tournament was in the quarterfinals, where he lost by decision to Alexandre Pantoja.

Ultimate Fighting Championship
Kara-France was signed by the UFC in July 2018 and he made his UFC debut on December 1, 2018 at UFC Fight Night: dos Santos vs. Tuivasa against Ashkan Mokhtarian. However, on November 21, 2018,  Moktarian was pulled from the fight, citing an injury, and he was replaced by Elias Garcia. After both fighters getting knocked down, Kara-France won the fight via unanimous decision. Both fighters were awarded US$50,000 Fight of the Night bonuses.

Two months later, Kara-France faced Raulian Paiva on February 10, 2019 at UFC 234.  He won the fight via split decision.

Kara-France faced Mark De La Rosa on August 31, 2019 at UFC Fight Night: Andrade vs. Zhang. He won the fight via unanimous decision.

Kara-France was briefly linked to a bout to Sergio Pettis on December 14, 2019 at UFC 245. However, in early October, Pettis revealed that he was entertaining offers from other promotions after the completion of his previous contract and did not currently have a fight lined up with the promotion. Kara-France instead faced Brandon Moreno. He lost the fight by unanimous decision.

Kara-France faced Tyson Nam on February 23, 2020 at UFC Fight Night 168. He won the fight via unanimous decision.

Kara-France was expected to face Alex Perez on May 16, 2020. However, on April 9, Dana White, the president of UFC announced that this event was postponed to a future date due to COVID-19 pandemic.

Kara-France faced Brandon Royval on September 27, 2020 at UFC 253. After both fighters were knocked down in the first round, Kara-France lost the fight via submission in the second round. This fight earned him the Fight of the Night award.

As the first bout of his new four-fight contract, Kara-France faced Rogério Bontorin on March 6, 2021 at UFC 259. He won the fight via knockout in round one. This fight earned him the Performance of the Night award.

Kara-France next faced former UFC Bantamweight Champion Cody Garbrandt on December 11, 2021 at UFC 269. He won the fight via TKO in the first round. The win also earned Kara-France his second consecutive Performance of the Night bonus award.

Kara-France faced Askar Askarov on March 26, 2022 at UFC on ESPN 33. He spoiled Askarov's undefeated record, handing him his first loss via unanimous decision.

Kara-France faced former flyweight champion Brandon Moreno in a rematch on July 30, 2022, with the interim UFC Flyweight Championship on the line, at UFC 277. He lost the fight via TKO in the third round. The bout earned him his fourth Fight of the Night award.

Kara-France was scheduled to face Alex Perez on February 12, 2023, at UFC 284. However, Kara-France was pull from of the fight, citing a knee injury.

Kara-France is scheduled to face Amir Albazi on June 3, 2023 at UFC Fight Night 226.

Personal life
Kai and his wife Chardae have a son, Cobi (born 2021).

Championships and accomplishments

Mixed martial arts 
 Ultimate Fighting Championships
 Fight of the Night (Fourth times) 
 Performance of the Night (Two times)

Mixed martial arts record

|-
|Loss
|align=center|24–10 (1)
|Brandon Moreno
|TKO (body kick and punches)
|UFC 277
|
|align=center|3
|align=center|4:34
|Dallas, Texas, United States
|
|-
|Win
|align=center|24–9 (1)
|Askar Askarov
|Decision (unanimous)
|UFC on ESPN: Blaydes vs. Daukaus
|
|align=center|3
|align=center|5:00
|Columbus, Ohio, United States
|
|-
|Win
|align=center|23–9 (1)
|Cody Garbrandt
|TKO (punches)
|UFC 269
|
|align=center|1
|align=center|3:21
|Las Vegas, Nevada, United States
|
|-
|Win
|align=center|22–9 (1)
|Rogério Bontorin
|KO (punches)
|UFC 259
|
|align=center|1
|align=center|4:55
|Las Vegas, Nevada, United States
|
|-
|Loss
|align=center|21–9 (1)
|Brandon Royval
|Submission (guillotine choke)
|UFC 253
|
|align=center|2
|align=center|0:48
|Abu Dhabi, United Arab Emirates
|
|-
|Win
|align=center|21–8 (1)
|Tyson Nam
|Decision (unanimous)
|UFC Fight Night: Felder vs. Hooker 
|
|align=center|3
|align=center|5:00
|Auckland, New Zealand
|
|-
|Loss
|align=center|20–8 (1)
|Brandon Moreno
|Decision (unanimous)
|UFC 245 
|
|align=center|3
|align=center|5:00
|Las Vegas, Nevada, United States
| 
|-
|Win
|align=center|20–7 (1)
|Mark De La Rosa
|Decision (unanimous)
|UFC Fight Night: Andrade vs. Zhang
|
|align=center|3
|align=center|5:00
|Shenzhen, China
|
|-
|Win
|align=center|19–7 (1)
|Raulian Paiva 
|Decision (split)
|UFC 234
|
|align=center|3
|align=center|5:00
|Melbourne, Australia
|
|-
|Win
|align=center|18–7 (1)
|Elias Garcia
|Decision (unanimous)
|UFC Fight Night: dos Santos vs. Tuivasa
|
|align=center|3
|align=center|5:00
|Adelaide, Australia
|
|-
|Win
|align=center|17–7 (1)
|Xiaoyu Shi
|Submission (rear-naked choke)
|Glory of Heroes: New Zealand vs. China
|
|align=center|1
|align=center|N/A
|Auckland, New Zealand
|
|-
|Win
|align=center|16–7 (1)
|Huoyixibai Chuhayifu
|Decision (unanimous)
|WLF W.A.R.S. 19
|
|align=center|3
|align=center|5:00
|Zhengzhou, China
|
|-
|Win
|align=center|15–7 (1)
|Aori Qileng
|Decision (unanimous)
|WLF W.A.R.S. 14
|
|align=center|3
|align=center|5:00
|Zhengzhou, China
|
|-
|Win
|align=center|14–7 (1)
|Ze Wu
|TKO (punches)
|WLF W.A.R.S. 13
|
|align=center|1
|align=center|2:01
|Zhengzhou, China
|
|-
|Win
|align=center|13–7 (1)
|Rodolfo Marques
|KO (punch)
|Hex Fight Series 8
|
|align=center|3
|align=center|2:59
|Melbourne, Australia
|
|-
|Loss
|align=center|12–7 (1)
|Tatsumitsu Wada
|Decision (unanimous)
|Rizin World Grand Prix 2016: 2nd Round
|
|align=center|3
|align=center|5:00
|Saitama, Japan
|
|-
|Win
|align=center|12–6 (1)
|Crisanto Pitpitunge
|TKO (cartwheel kick and punches)
|Pacific Xtreme Combat 52
|
|align=center|3
|align=center|0:00
|Mangilao, Guam
|
|-
|Win
|align=center|11–6 (1)
|Josh Duenas
|TKO (punches)
|Pacific Xtreme Combat 50
|
|align=center|1
|align=center|0:22
|Mangilao, Guam
|
|-
|Win
|align=center|10–6 (1)
|Shantaram Maharaj
|TKO (punches)
|Bragging Rights 7
|
|align=center|1
|align=center|1:33
|Perth, Australia
|
|-
|Win
|align=center|9–6 (1)
|Dindo Camansa
|KO (punches)
|Malaysian Invasion: Mixed Martial A'rr
|
|align=center|1
|align=center|0:12
|Andaman Sea, Thailand
|
|-
|Win
|align=center|8–6 (1)
|Ik Hwan Jang
|TKO (punches)
|PRO Fighting 10
|
|align=center|1
|align=center|0:08
|Taipei, Taiwan
|
|-
|Loss
|align=center|7–6 (1)
|Jumayi Ayideng
|Decision (unanimous)
|Kunlun Fight 18
|
|align=center|3
|align=center|5:00
|Nanjing, China
|
|-
|Loss
|align=center|7–5 (1)
|Mark Striegl
|Submission (rear-naked choke)
|Malaysian Invasion 2: Grand Finals
|
|align=center|1
|align=center|2:10
|Kuala Lumpur, Malaysia
|
|-
|Loss
|align=center|7–4 (1)
|Gustavo Falciroli
|Submission (brabo choke)
|AFC 9
|
|align=center|1
|align=center|4:55
|Melbourne, Australia
|
|-
|Win
|align=center|7–3 (1)
|Tieyin Wu
|Decision (unanimous)
|Kunlun Fight 1
|
|align=center|3
|align=center|5:00
|Pattaya, Thailand
|
|-
|NC
|align=center|6–3 (1)
|Gustavo Falciroli
|No Contest
|AFC 7
|
|align=center|2
|align=center|3:20
|Melbourne, Australia
|
|-
|Win
|align=center|6–3
|Tieyin Wu
|Submission (guillotine choke)
|Bandung Fighting Club
|
|align=center|1
|align=center|1:54
|Manila, Philippines
|
|-
|Win
|align=center|5–3
|Yudi Cahyadi
|Decision (unanimous)
|Bandung Fighting Club
|
|align=center|3
|align=center|5:00
|Bandung, Indonesia
|
|-
|Win
|align=center|4–3
|Ho-Joon Kim
|KO (head kick)
|PRO Fighting 8
|
|align=center|1
|align=center|3:44
|Taipei, Taiwan
|
|-
|Loss
|align=center|3–3
|Danaa Batgerel
|Decision (unanimous)
|Legend Fighting Championship 11
|
|align=center|3
|align=center|5:00
|Kuala Lumpur, Malaysia
|
|-
|Win
|align=center|3–2
|Caleb Lally
|Decision (unanimous)
|Rage in the Cage: MMA Fighting Championship
|
|align=center|3
|align=center|5:00
|Tauranga, New Zealand
|
|-
|Win
|align=center|2–2
|Sam Chan
|Submission (guillotine choke)
|Legend Fighting Championship 10
|
|align=center|1
|align=center|3:21
|Hong Kong, SAR, China
|
|-
|Loss
|align=center|1–2
|Agustin Delarmino
|KO (punches)
|Legend Fighting Championship 8
|
|align=center|3
|align=center|0:29
|Hong Kong, SAR, China
|
|-
|Loss
|align=center|1–1
|Chad George
|KO (punch)
|The Cage 2: USA vs. New Zealand
|
|align=center|1
|align=center|2:04
|Whakatane, New Zealand
|
|-
|Win
| align=center| 1–0
| Ray Kaitiana
| TKO (punches)
| Supremacy Cage Fighting 7
| 
| align=center| 1
| align=center| N/A
| Auckland, New Zealand
|
|-

Mixed martial arts exhibition record

|-
|Loss
|align=center|1–1
| Alexandre Pantoja
| Decision (unanimous)
| rowspan=2| The Ultimate Fighter: Tournament of Champions
| 
|align=center|2
|align=center|5:00
| rowspan=2|Las Vegas, Nevada, United States
|
|-
|Win
|align=center|1–0
| Terrence Mitchell
| KO (punch)
| 
|align=center|1
|align=center|0:30
|

See also
 List of current UFC fighters
 List of male mixed martial artists

References

External links
  
 

1993 births
Living people
Sportspeople from Auckland
New Zealand male kickboxers
New Zealand male mixed martial artists
Flyweight mixed martial artists
Mixed martial artists utilizing kickboxing
Mixed martial artists utilizing Brazilian jiu-jitsu
New Zealand practitioners of Brazilian jiu-jitsu
Ultimate Fighting Championship male fighters
Kunlun Fight MMA Fighters
Waikato Tainui people
Ngāti Kahungunu people
New Zealand Māori sportspeople